XHROO-FM 95.3 is a radio station in Chetumal, Quintana Roo, known as Kiss FM. It is owned by Grupo SIPSE.

History
XHROO received its concession on November 21, 1988.

References

Radio stations in Quintana Roo
Chetumal